Tayfun Talipoğlu Typewriter Museum, or shortly Typewriter Museum, ( or Daktilo Müzesi) is a technology museum in Odunpazarı, Eskişehir, Turkey exhibiting typewriters.

The Typewriter Museum is the first one of its kind in Turkey. Owned and operated by Odunpazarı Municipality, the museum is situated in the historic Şamlıoğlu Mansion. Inaugurated on May 15, 2016, it is named for the journalist and television producer Tayfun Talipoğlu, who donated a number of typewriters he used. A wax sculpture of him is in the museum. There is also a wax sculpture of the former prime minister Bülent Ecevit (1925–2006) typing on his typewriter, who worked for Turkey's press attaché in London, England. More than fifty typewriters of various makes and models are on display, including products of manufacturers like Olivetti, Remington Rand, Halda, Brother Industries, Alpina and Facit.

The museum is open every day from 10:00 to 17:00 hours local time, but Mondays.

References

Museums in Eskişehir
Technology museums in Turkey
Museums established in 2016
2016 establishments in Turkey
Odunpazarı